The Drummond class are three corvettes designed and built in France based on the A69 s. The ships were commissioned in the Argentine Navy between 1978 and 1982.

The ships, when operational, serve in the "Atlantic Area of Operations" of the Argentine Navy, based on Mar del Plata Naval Base, province of Buenos Aires. Their mission is to patrol Argentina's exclusive economic zone and to enforce fishing regulations, but according to reports in November 2012 they "hardly sail because of lack of resources for operational expenses". As of 2020 only Granville, which had been refitted in mid-2019, was reported operational, with the other ships of the class in reserve.

Design

Although its designers consider the A69 D'Estienne d'Orves class to be avisos, Argentina classifies the ships as corvettes.

The Drummond-class ships are equipped mostly with German and Dutch electronic systems (instead of French) for better compatibility with the two MEKO classes in Argentine service, and integrated with the indigenous "Miniaco" combat system.

History
The first two ships of the class were built in 1977 in France for the South African Navy. The sale was embargoed by United Nations Security Council Resolution 418 during sea trials and the ships bought by Argentina instead on 25 September 1978. There are minor differences in equipment fit compared to her sisters, for instance Granville has French Dagaie decoys rather than the British Corvus chaff launchers.

On 28 March 1982 Granville and  sailed from Argentina and took up station northeast of Port Stanley to cover the main amphibious landings on 2 April. Meanwhile,  covered the assault on South Georgia, sustaining significant damage from the Royal Marines in the process. After repairs she joined her sister ships north of the Falklands as Task Group 79.4, hoping to catch ships detached from the British task force. On 29 April the corvettes were trailed by the submarine  whilst she was looking for the Argentine aircraft carrier .

The Drummond class carried pennant numbers P-1 to P-3 until the introduction of the s in 1985 when they became P-31 to P-33. In 1994, they participated in Operation Uphold Democracy, the United Nations blockade of Haiti. During this time, they were based at Roosevelt Roads Naval Station in Puerto Rico.

ARA Granville was reported as active in the South Atlantic following a maintenance period which concluded in 2019.  However, in the same year it was also reported that all three Drummond-class vessels could be decommissioned and that consideration was being given to the potential transfer of the ships to the Uruguayan Navy.

Specification 

Displacement: 1,170 tons (empty); 1,320  tons (full load)
Length: 
Beam: 
Draught: 
Propulsion:
2 shafts / propellers
2 SEMT Pielstick 12 PC2.2 V 400 diesel engines,  tot.
Max shaft horsepower: n/a shp max
Speed: 
Range: 4,500  nautical miles at 
Armament
4 × Aérospatiale MM 38 Exocet SSM (In 2020, work was underway to maintain the missile's operational relevance)
1 × 4in/55 (100 mm) Creusot-Loire CADAM turret DP automatic fast-firing gun
1 × twin 40 mm 70-cal. OTO Melara (Breda Bofors) AA guns
2 × 20 mm L/ 90 Oerlikon automatic guns
2 × 12.7 mm machine guns
2 × triple 324 mm ILAS-3 ASW torpedo tubes (Whitehead AS-244 torpedoes, quantity n/a)
Aircraft: None
Complement: 95
Radar:
Air/Surface Search: Signaal DA08 (equipped with IFF).
Surface Search & helicopter control: Signaal ZW06.
Fire Control: Signaal STIR
Navigation: Decca TM 1226
Sonar: Thomson Sintra Diodon
Electronic Warfare:
Decoys: (no details available)
Datalink: (no details available)
Weapons Control System: Thomson-CSF System Vega, CSEE Panda MK2 director (optical), NASA director (optronic, for the 40 mm gun).
Concept/Program: French designed and built general purpose avisos (classified as "corvettes" by the Argentine navy).
Builder: n/a shipyard, Lorient, France.
Designer: n/a, France.

Ships in the class

References

Further reading

External links

World Navies Today: Argentina

 
Corvette classes
Corvettes of Argentina
Ships built in France